Jazirat Ziadi is a Yemeni island that is located in the Red Sea. It is considered an 'Uzlah (sub-district) of  Al-Makha District, Taiz Governorate.

See also
Perim

References 

 http://www.cso-yemen.org/
 http://www.yemen-nic.info/
 World Gazetteer:Yemen
 http://ye.geoview.info/jazirat_ziyadi,69416

Islands of Yemen
Taiz Governorate
Sub-districts in Al-Makha District